Now Boni (also Romanized as Now Bonī; also known as Noh Bonī) is a village in Ganjabad Rural District, Esmaili District, Anbarabad County, Kerman Province, Iran. At the 2006 census, its population was 389, in 82 families.

References 

Populated places in Anbarabad County